The Constitution of the State of Alabama is the basic governing document of the U.S. state of Alabama. It was adopted in 2022 and is Alabama's seventh state constitution.

History
Alabama has had seven constitutions to date, all but the current one established via State Conventions:  (converting Alabama Territory into a State), 1861 (Secession), 1865 (Reconstruction), 1868 (Reconstruction), 1875 (ending Reconstruction), 1901 (Jim Crow) and the current document, adopted in 2022. Governor of Alabama Kay Ivey formally proclaimed the new constitution to be in effect on Monday, November 28, 2022, shortly after the state's election results were certified.

Recompilation of the Alabama Constitution of 1901
The current Alabama Constitution is a recompilation of the Alabama Constitution of 1901. The recompilation had five objectives, as follows:

arranging it in proper articles, parts, and sections;
removing all racist language (examples of racist language being removed included Section 102 of Article IV of the former Constitution, which forbade "marriage between any white person and a Negro, or descendant of a negro".);
deleting duplicative and repealed provisions;
consolidating provisions regarding economic development; and
arranging all local amendments by county of application.

General overview
The Alabama Constitution, in common with all other state constitutions, defines a tripartite government organized under a presidential system. Executive power is vested in the Governor of Alabama, legislative power in the Alabama State Legislature (bicameral, composed of the Alabama House of Representatives and Alabama Senate), and judicial power in the Judiciary of Alabama. Direct, partisan, secret, and free elections are provided for filling all branches.

References

2022 establishments in Alabama
2022 in Alabama
2022 in American law
Alabama law
Alabama